Aleksandr Aleksandrovich Bryantsev (14 April 1883 – 30 September 1961) was a Soviet and Russian actor, theater director and pedagogue.

He was born in Saint Petersburg to an official's famil and graduated from The Second Saint Petersburg Gymnasium in 1902.

Awards 

 Honored Art Worker of the RSFSR (1932)
 Three Orders of the Red Banner of Labour (1939, 1946, 1953)
 People's Artist of the RSFSR (1939)
 Stalin Prize, 2nd class (1950)
 People's Artist of the USSR (1956)
 Order of the Badge of Honour (1957)
 Medal "For Valiant Labour in the Great Patriotic War 1941–1945"
 Medal "In Commemoration of the 250th Anniversary of Leningrad"

External links
 Biography

1883 births
1961 deaths
20th-century Russian male actors
Communist Party of the Soviet Union members
Male actors from Saint Petersburg
Theatre directors from Saint Petersburg
People's Artists of the RSFSR
People's Artists of the USSR
Stalin Prize winners
Recipients of the Order of the Red Banner of Labour
Male actors from the Russian Empire
Theatre directors from the Russian Empire

Russian male film actors
Russian male stage actors
Soviet male film actors
Soviet male stage actors
Soviet theatre directors